Battle of Bornholm may refer to the following battles:

Battle of Bornholm (1227)
Battle of Bornholm (1456)
Battle of Bornholm (1535)
Battle of Bornholm (1563), a naval action precipitating the Northern Seven Years' War
Battle of Bornholm (1565)
Battle of Bornholm (1676), a naval battle between a Danish-Dutch and a Swedish fleet during the Scanian War
Battle of Bornholm (1945)